Vlăhița (until 1899 Szentegyházas-Oláhfalu) is a town in Harghita County, Romania. It lies in the Székely Land, an ethno-cultural region in eastern Transylvania.

The town administers two villages:
 Băile Homorod / Homoródfürdő
 Minele Lueta / Szentkeresztbánya

Its Romanian name is of Slavic origin, meaning "little Vlach", while its Hungarian name means "Church of the Saint".

History 
In Roman times a Roman fort was functioning in nearby Băile Homorod.

Vlăhița (Oláhfalu)  was first mentioned as a Romanian settlement (Villa Olachalis). The town was part of the Székely Land area of the historical Transylvania province. It belonged to Udvarhelyszék until the administrative reform of Transylvania in 1876, when it fell within the Udvarhely County of the Austria-Hungary. After the Treaty of Trianon of 1920, it became part of Romania and fell within Odorhei County during the interwar period. In 1940, the second Vienna Award granted the Northern Transylvania to Hungary and it was held by Hungary until 1944. After Soviet occupation, the Romanian administration returned and the settlement became officially part of Romania in 1947. Between 1952 and 1960, the town fell within the Magyar Autonomous Region, between 1960 and 1968 the Mureș-Magyar Autonomous Region. In 1968, the province was abolished, and since then, the town has been part of Harghita County.

Demographics 

The town has a total population of 6,820 of which 6,749 (98.96%) are Székely Hungarians, making it the town with the highest proportion of Hungarians in Romania (2011 census).

Location 
The town is situated between Odorheiu Secuiesc and Miercurea-Ciuc. Its 860 m altitude makes it the highest town in Harghita County.

Culture 
The town is famous for its Children's Orchestra (Filarmonica de copii/Gyermekfilharmónia), in which more than 140 youngsters sing and play instruments.

Twin town 
  Szarvas, Hungary (1994)

References 

Towns in Romania
Monotowns in Romania
Populated places in Harghita County
Localities in Transylvania
Székely communities